Navjot Altaf, often referred to simply as "Navjot," is an artist, currently based in Bastar and Mumbai, India. Over the course of her four-decade career, Navjot has worked in a variety of media, including painting, drawing, photography, sculpture, video, installation, mixed-media, and public art. Navjot's art draws from an extensive knowledge of art history, as well as an understanding of the tribal craftsmanship of India, particularly of the Bastar region. Her work has been exhibited in galleries and museums worldwide, including at Tate Modern in London, the National Gallery of Modern Art in New Delhi, at the XV Sydney Biennale, in Sydney, Australia and at the Talwar Gallery in New York City and New Delhi.

Life and career 
Born in Meerut, India, in 1949, Navjot earned a degree in Fine and Applied Arts from Sir J.J. School of Art in Mumbai. While in school, she met artist Altaf and they married in 1972, travelling together extensively and sharing a studio over the course of the next three decades. Navjot continues to cite their relationship as a major part of her artistic growth.

Activism 
Both Navjot and her husband were members of the Progressive Youth Movement (PROYOM) in the 1970s, and liberal political ideology has continued to inform her creative process throughout her career. Much of Navjot's work attempts to question and expand the expected interaction between artist and viewer, creating a cooperative, dialectic conversation around the work of art. In a bold challenge of the accepted delineation between "art" and "craft," Navjot has collaborated with traditional craftspeople of India, particularly in the villages of Bastar, in the creation of her sculptures and installations, and has worked to bring their work to exhibitions in Mumbai. Her fascination with oral history, ritual, and communal creation has led to other cooperative projects; the 2010 work Touch IV, for example, emerged from a collaboration between the artist and a group of sex workers, and created the space for a multivocal communication about the ideas of intimacy and desire. While she has exhibited in galleries and museums worldwide, Navjot consistently seeks audiences beyond traditional art spaces; she has organized art workshops for women and children in villages in Bastar, and she has worked to design alternative public spaces that allow young people to meet and engage with each other creatively.

Feminism 
In many ways, Navjot's engagement with women's issues springs from the same social activism that undergirds her collaborative projects. Much of her work positions traditional female crafts, such as weaving, within the context of contemporary high art, and in so doing it grants the craftswomen themselves a new level of personal and artistic agency. Many of Navjot's sculptures also engage directly with the female body and its representation in Indian art, often both invoking and subverting the forms of traditional fertility figures or female divinities.

Awards and honours 
 1971: Bombay Art Society's Annual Art Exhibition award
 1980 : Maharashtra State Art Exhibition award
 1983: All India Fine Arts and Crafts Society award

References

External links 
 
 Art Pulse, Navjot Altaf: Lacuna in Testimony, 2010.
 Time Out Mumbai, Sister City, 18 February 2010.
 Verve, The Intimacy of Sensation, April, 2008.
 Magazine of the Royal Ontario Museum, Stars of the ROM's Collections, Summer 2008.
 The New York Times, Feminist Art Finally Takes Center Stage, 29 January 2007.
 The New York Times, Navjot Altaf, 16 December 2005.
 The New York Times, NAVJOT, 4 April 2003.
 The Hindu, Dialogues on Representation, 16 February 2003.

1949 births
Living people
20th-century Indian women artists
21st-century Indian women artists
Artists from Mumbai